This is a list of fictional characters from DC Comics who are or have been enemies of Wonder Woman.

Central rogues gallery
In alphabetical order (with issue and date of first appearance and when or if they were involved in Villainy Incorporated, a league of Wonder Woman rivals founded by Eviless, in which at one time or another most major Wonder Woman villains were involved).

Other recurring antagonists

In chronological order (with issue and date of first appearance), separated by those with multiple appearances and those that appeared in only one issue or story.

Multiple appearances

Golden Age

Silver Age

Bronze Age

Post-Crisis

The New 52 & DC Rebirth
In September 2011, The New 52 rebooted DC's continuity.

One-shots

Golden Age

Silver Age

Bronze Age

Post-Crisis

The New 52 & DC Rebirth

Teams
In chronological order (with issue and date of first appearance)

Antagonists in other media
Wonder Woman villains created in other media, with no appearances in previous or subsequent comics.

Antagonists from comics in other media
A number of villains from the comic books have made an appearance, or appearances, in other media featuring Wonder Woman.

See also
 List of Wonder Woman supporting characters
 List of Superman enemies
 List of Batman family enemies
 List of Blue Beetle enemies
 List of Flash enemies
 Rogues
 List of Green Lantern enemies
 List of Aquaman enemies

References

 
Wonder Woman characters
Enemies
Lists of DC Comics characters
Lists of DC Comics supervillains